Vegreville-Viking was a provincial electoral district in Alberta, Canada, mandated to return a single member to the Legislative Assembly of Alberta from 1993 to 2004.

History
The Vegreville-Viking electoral district was created in the 1993 electoral boundary re-distribution from the Vegreville and Vermilion-Viking electoral districts.

The Vegreville-Viking electoral district would be abolished in the 2004 electoral boundary re-distribution with a majority of the district forming the new Fort Saskatchewan-Vegreville electoral district and small portions of the eastern part of the district forming Lac La Biche-St. Paul and Vermilion-Lloydminster electoral districts.

Members of the Legislative Assembly (MLAs)

Election results

1993 general election

1997 general election

2001 general election

See also
List of Alberta provincial electoral districts
Vegreville, Alberta, a town in eastern Alberta
Viking, Alberta, a town in eastern Alberta

References

Further reading

External links
Elections Alberta
The Legislative Assembly of Alberta

Former provincial electoral districts of Alberta